John Fullerton MacArthur Jr. (born June 19, 1939) is an American Protestant pastor and author known for his internationally syndicated Christian teaching radio and television program Grace to You. He has been the pastor of Grace Community Church, a non-denominational church in Sun Valley, California since February 9, 1969. He is currently the chancellor emeritus of The Master's University in Santa Clarita and The Master's Seminary.

MacArthur is a strong proponent of expository preaching, and has been acknowledged by Christianity Today as one of the most influential preachers of his time. MacArthur has written or edited more than 150 books, most notably the MacArthur Study Bible, which has sold more than one million copies, receiving a Gold Medallion Book Award.

Early life and schooling 
The grandson of Canadian Anglican minister Harry MacArthur (died 1950) and son of Baptist radio preacher Jack MacArthur (born in Calgary, Canada) and Irene Dockendorf, MacArthur was born in Los Angeles.  During a 1979 interview, Pastor MacArthur stated he is "distantly related to General Douglas MacArthur." He went on to say, "I understand that I’m a fifth cousin, and so it’s quite a distance but nonetheless we are related." MacArthur followed in his father's footsteps to enroll at the fundamentalist Bob Jones College from 1957 to 1959.  In 1960, after a year off, he was accepted to the Free Methodist Church’s Los Angeles Pacific College, where in his senior year he observed two games of football, going on field once for one play (see 1962 yearbook statistics). In 1963, he was granted a Masters of Divinity from the Bible Institute of Los Angeles's new Talbot Theological Seminary, in La Mirada, California, with honors. MacArthur was also given an honorary degree from Talbot Theological Seminary (Doctor of Divinity, 1977) and from Grace Graduate School (1976).

Career
While at Bob Jones University in South Carolina, MacArthur’s father recruited him to the Voice of Calvary singing quartet, often broadcast on Christian radio in Southern California.  From 1964 to 1966, MacArthur was hired by his father as associate pastor at the Harry MacArthur Memorial Bible Church (now Calvary Bible Church in Burbank, California), which his father Jack had planted and named after his own father. From 1966 to 1969, MacArthur was hired as the faculty representative for Talbot Theological Seminary. On February 9, 1969, he was hired as the third and youngest pastor at the nondenominational Grace Community Church of Sun Valley, California.

MacArthur's daily radio and television program, Grace to You, now broadcast throughout much of the world, was created by the Grace media team to publicize audio cassettes of sermons; in 1977, it was first broadcast in Baltimore, Maryland. In 1985, MacArthur was made President of Los Angeles Baptist College, now The Master's University, a four-year Christian liberal-arts college. In 1986, he was made President of the new Master's Seminary.

Nearly 43 years after beginning in the pulpit of Grace Community, MacArthur completed one of his own life goals, that of preaching through the entire New Testament on June 5, 2011.

Theological positions

Authority of scripture 
Central to MacArthur's theology is a very high view of scripture (the 66 books of the Protestant Bible). He believes that scripture is inerrant and infallible because it is "the Word of God" and that God cannot lie. Furthermore, he believes that we are obliged to render full submission to scripture above all else and that "[t]o mishandle the Word of God is to misrepresent the One who wrote it. To reject its claims is to call Him a liar. To ignore its message is to snub that which the Holy Spirit inspired."

Cessationism 
MacArthur is a cessationist, holding that the "sign gifts" (such as prophecy) described in the Bible were temporarily granted to the apostles to authenticate the origin and truth of the scriptures, and that at the close of the Apostolic Age these gifts had served their purpose and ceased to be granted. He is one of the most prominent voices in American Christianity against the continuationist beliefs of Pentecostalism and the Charismatic Movement, which assert that God continues to confer sign gifts today. MacArthur has written three books on the subject. In October 2013, his church hosted a conference called "Strange Fire" to mark the launch of a book of the same name. The event featured a number of speakers who argued for cessationist theology and strongly critiqued the Charismatic Movement.

MacArthur argues that modern "visions, revelations, voices from heaven...dreams, speaking in tongues, prophecies, out-of-body experiences, trip to heaven, anointings, miracles – all false, all lies, all deceptions – attributed falsely to the Holy Spirit." He has remarked that "[t]he Charismatic movement has stolen the Holy Spirit and created a golden calf, and they're dancing around the golden calf as if it were the Holy Spirit."

Christology 
In 1983, MacArthur first published his belief in the doctrine of "incarnational sonship." In 1989, after some criticism, he defended his views in a plenary session of the annual convention of the Independent Fundamental Churches of America (IFCA). A decade later, he announced he had retracted this view via an article from Grace to You.

Complementarianism 
MacArthur has stated that he opposes both "male chauvinist and feminist views." He has a complementarian view on gender roles and considers that the Bible forbids women to preach to men or to exercise authority over men in churches, and he believes that the Biblical roles of elder and pastor are restricted to men. To this end he cites the biblical passage of 1 Timothy 2:11-12.

Dispensational theology 
MacArthur describes himself as a "leaky dispensationalist."  MacArthur holds to the dispensationalist school of premillennialism, a pre-tribulational Rapture of the Church, and a literal Millennium.  He teaches a completely restored Israel shall inherit physical ownership of the land of Canaan on the earth.

Lordship of Christ 
MacArthur believes "that if you confess with your mouth Jesus as Lord, and believe in your heart that God raised Him from the dead, you will be saved".  This submission to Jesus as Lord when converting to faith in Jesus Christ became known to Arminians as the “Lordship salvation controversy” in the 1980s.  MacArthur argues that confessing Jesus Christ as Lord is a necessary component of free grace theology. He states, "You must receive Jesus Christ for who He is, both Lord and Savior, to be truly saved." Regarding eternal security, he states, "It should never be presented merely as a matter of being once saved, always saved—with no regard for what you believe or do. The writer of  states frankly that only those who continue living holy lives will enter the Lord's presence." These views raised controversy within American evangelicalism and were challenged in print by non-lordship dispensationalist theologians Charles Ryrie and Zane C. Hodges, who argued that MacArthur's ministry was teaching a form of works-based salvation. MacArthur denied the charge, as attested on two tapes recorded in 1989 when he was asked to “reason together with the IFCA man.”

Young Earth creationism 
MacArthur advocates Young Earth creationism in his book The Battle For the Beginning (2001), and in his sermons. Speaking about evolutionary theory, he writes that Christians "ought to expose such lies for what they are and oppose them vigorously." He argues that "the battle for the beginning is ultimately a battle between two mutually exclusive faiths – faith in Scripture versus faith in anti-theistic hypotheses. It is not really a battle between science and the Bible."

Controversies 

MacArthur is an outspoken critic of same-sex marriage, the ordination of women, the Roman Catholic Church, and the social justice movement. He has delivered multiple sermons where he discusses these issues.

For example, with respect to sexual orientation, he asserted that "no one is gay" as "God didn't hardwire anybody" to be gay any more than he "hardwires" individuals to be adulterers or bank robbers. MacArthur compared the assertion that sexual orientation is a born trait to a hypothetical bank robber's protestation, "I keep robbing banks, but I'm a robber. I'm a bank robber. What am I gonna do? I'm a bank robber."

In 2012, at the annual Shepherd's Conference, MacArthur was participating in a word association questionnaire when the moderator gave the name "Steven Furtick." MacArthur responded "unqualified" and proceeded to argue that Furtick, pastor of Elevation Church, was not qualified, by Biblical standards, to be a pastor. Furtick responded to this comment in his 2016 book Unqualified: How God Uses Broken People to Do Big Things.

In 2019, at the Truth Matters Conference, during another word association questionnaire, MacArthur was given the prompt "Beth Moore". MacArthur responded, "Go home." Reiterating his stance on 1 Timothy 2:12, he went on to state, "There is no case that can be made biblically for a woman preacher. Period. Paragraph. End of Discussion." Moore responded to this stance by stating on her Twitter account, "I did not surrender to a calling of man when I was 18 years old. I surrendered to a calling of God. It never occurs to me for a second to not fulfill it."

In 2020 and 2021, during the COVID-19 global crisis, MacArthur contravened orders from Los Angeles County public health officials regarding services at Grace Community Church, and insisted that no one from the church had become seriously ill, despite reports to the contrary.  His major contention was that there was no justification for closing down churches over a disease with 94% survival rate according to misinterpreted data from the United States Centers for Disease Control and Prevention (CDC). He stated that there was a deadlier virus killing people—the virus of sin—leading many to eternal death, in contrast to physical death. Los Angeles County sued the church over its refusal to close down, and the church counter-sued, claiming that the County was violating rights to freedom of religion. In August 2021, MacArthur told congregants that "many people" had contracted COVID-19 while it "went through" the church in December 2020 and January 2021, including both him and his wife. Eventually, all lawsuits were settled out of court with the County of Los Angeles and the State of California paying $400,000 each to Grace Community Church.

Domestic abuse controversy
In February 2023 Christianity Today published multiple instances of MacArthur's Grace Community church advising women to stay with sexually and physically abusive husbands. This was sourced through interviews with ex-Grace Community Church Elder Hohn Cho. Cho discovered that Grace Community Church advised women to stay in abusive relationships and worked to have the church apologize for past mistakes. Cho brought letters to the elders and MacArthur who ultimately told him he needed to "walk back" his findings if he wanted to remain an elder. Cho resigned the next day. One of the victims (Eileen Gray) in particular was shamed publicly in front of the congregation by MacArthur for divorcing a David Gray who later was convicted of aggravated child molestation, corporal injury to a child, and child abuse. MacArthur told her she needed to model for her children how to "suffer for Jesus" by enduring David's abuse. Cho was told by MacArthur to "forget it" when he called on the elders to "do justice."

Personal life
MacArthur is married to his wife, Patricia. They have four children, fifteen grandchildren, and had two great-grandsons by 2017.

Selected publications

Twelve Extraordinary Women: God Shaped Women of the Bible, and What He Wants to Do with You  (October 5, 2008)
Twelve Ordinary Men: How the Master Shaped His Disciples for Greatness, and What He Wants to Do with You (May 8, 2006)
One Perfect Life: The Complete Story of the Lord Jesus (March 4, 2013)
Anxious for Nothing: God's Cure for the Cares of Your Soul (John Macarthur Study) (February 1, 2012)
Safe in the Arms of God: Truth from Heaven About the Death of a Child (July 8, 2003)
Saved Without A Doubt: Being Sure of Your Salvation (January 1, 2010)
The Charismatics: A Doctrinal Perspective hardback (1978)
Fundamentals of the Faith: 13 Lessons to Grow in the Grace and Knowledge of Jesus Christ (February 24, 2009)
The Charismatic softback (1978)
Gospel According to Jesus (1989) 
Charismatic Chaos (1993) 
Our Sufficiency in Christ (1998) 
Ashamed of the Gospel: When the Church Becomes Like the World (2001) 
Think Biblically!: Recovering a Christian Worldview (2003) 
Fool's Gold?: Discerning Truth in an Age of Error (2005) 
The Jesus You Can't Ignore: What You Must Learn from the Bold Confrontations of Christ (2009) 
Strange Fire: The Danger of Offending the Holy Spirit with Counterfeit Worship (2013) 
Right Thinking in a Church Gone Astray: Finding Our Way Back to Biblical Truth (2017)
The Gospel According to Paul: Embracing the Good News at the Heart of Paul's Teachings (2017)
Biblical Doctrine: A Systematic Summary of Bible Truth (2017)
None Other: Discovering the God of the Bible (2017)
Worship: The Ultimate Priority (2012)
Parables (2015)

References

Further reading 

 John MacArthur: Servant of the Word and Flock, Iain H. Murray
 Seven Leaders: Pastors and Teachers, by Iain H. Murray
 John MacArthur:  An Insider's Tribute, by Don Green

External links 

John MacArthur.org – 40th anniversary legacy site presented by Grace Community Church
GTY.org resources page – all of MacArthur's sermons (audio and text) available for download

1939 births
Living people
20th-century Calvinist and Reformed theologians
20th-century Christian clergy
21st-century Calvinist and Reformed theologians
21st-century Christian clergy
Activists from California
American Baptist theologians
American Calvinist and Reformed Christians
American Calvinist and Reformed ministers
American Calvinist and Reformed theologians
American Christian clergy
American Christian writers
American Christian Young Earth creationists
American critics of Islam
American people of Canadian descent
American people of German descent
American people of Scottish descent
American radio personalities
American sermon writers
American television evangelists
Azusa Pacific University alumni
Bible commentators
Bob Jones University alumni
Cessationism
Christian critics of Islam
Christian fundamentalists
Christians from California
Critics of atheism
Critics of the Catholic Church
John
Male critics of feminism
Nondenominational Christianity
Players of American football from California
Talbot School of Theology alumni
Writers from Los Angeles